Pomeranian Switzerland is a hill country region in Pomerania in the Polish Voivodeship of West Pomerania. It is part of the West Pomeranian Lake District on the Baltic Uplands. In Polish, the term Pomeranian Switzerland has not established itself and is only rarely used. In Poland, they tend to speak of the Dramburg Lake District (Pojezierze Drawskie) when referring to Pomeranian Switzerland. The region around Połczyn Zdrój (Bad Polzin), by contrast, is known in Polish as Polzin Switzerland (Szwajcaria Połczyńska). The area has been described as a "region of beautiful lakes surrounded by beautiful woods."

Location 
Through the region runs the Polzin–Tempelburg section of route 163. The hill country of Pomeranian Switzerland rises to about 250 metres above sea level.

References

Literature 
 

Regions of Poland
Protected areas of Poland
West Pomeranian Voivodeship